Zane-Ray Brodie Holtz (born January 18, 1987) is a Canadian actor and model. He is best known for playing Richie Gecko on the El Rey Network television series From Dusk till Dawn: The Series (2014–2016) and K.O. Kelly on The CW series Riverdale and Katy Keene (2020).

Career
In 2013, he played Nick in Jodi Arias: Dirty Little Secret, a television movie about the murder of Travis Alexander.

In 2019, Holtz was added o the CW's Katy Keene, playing the role of Ko Kelly.

Personal life 
Holtz is married to Chelsea Thea Pagnini and they have four children.

Filmography

Film

Television

Music Videos

Web

References

External links

1987 births
Living people
Canadian male film actors
Canadian male television actors
Canadian expatriates in the United States
Male actors from Vancouver
Canadian male models